Amy Kwan Dict Weng  (born 1 February 1995) is a Malaysian former individual rhythmic gymnast.

Career 
She was part of the Malaysian team to win the bronze and silver medals in the women's rhythmic team all-around event at Glasgow 2014 and Gold Coast 2018 Commonwealth Games respectively. At Gold Coast 2018, she bagged five medals, including a gold in individual ribbon event. In the 2017 Southeast Asian Games, she won two golds and two silvers. One of her gold medal is the 100th gold medal for the Malaysia team. Kwan announced her retirement to run a dance studio on 30 July 2020.

Awards and accolades 
 2018 Olympian of the Year Award by Olympic Council of Malaysia  
 2018 National Sportswoman of the Year at the National Sports Awards
 Darjah Kebesaran Ahli Kegemilangan Sukan Selangor (AKS) (2018)

References

External links
 
 
 

1995 births
Commonwealth Games bronze medallists for Malaysia
Commonwealth Games gold medallists for Malaysia
Commonwealth Games medallists in gymnastics
Commonwealth Games silver medallists for Malaysia
Gymnasts at the 2014 Commonwealth Games
Gymnasts at the 2018 Commonwealth Games
Living people
Malaysian people of Chinese descent
Malaysian rhythmic gymnasts
People from Selangor
Southeast Asian Games gold medalists for Malaysia
Southeast Asian Games silver medalists for Malaysia
Southeast Asian Games bronze medalists for Malaysia
Southeast Asian Games medalists in gymnastics
Gymnasts at the 2018 Asian Games
Competitors at the 2017 Southeast Asian Games
Competitors at the 2019 Southeast Asian Games
Asian Games competitors for Malaysia
21st-century Malaysian women
Medallists at the 2018 Commonwealth Games